The Century: America's Time is a 15-part television series of documentaries produced by  ABC News about the 20th century and the rise of the United States as a superpower. The documentary originally aired on The History Channel in 1999.
Peter Jennings, anchor of ABC World News Tonight narrates the series.

Along with distinguished journalist Todd Brewster, Jennings co-authored a book titled The Century which became a national bestseller.  This series is part of the History Channel's "Cable in The Classroom" curriculum and the study guides for each episode can be found on their website, under the letter "C".

ABC ran a mini-marathon of the series on  September 15, 2001, in reaction to the September 11 attacks. The marathon signaled the transition from 24/7 news coverage, which had gone uninterrupted since the first reports of an incident at the World Trade Center, back to "normal" programming.

Episodes

See also
 Peter Jennings
 Todd Brewster
 The Century for Young People
 Lincoln's Gamble
 American Broadcasting Company 
 The History Channel

External links
 Interview with Jennings on The Century, Booknotes, December 27, 1998
 
 The Century: America's Time playlist on YouTube

1999 American television series debuts
1999 American television series endings
Century: America's Time, The
Century: America's Time, The
Century: America's Time, The
Television series about the history of the United States